Sverdlovsky District is an administrative and municipal district (raion), one of the twenty-four in Oryol Oblast, Russia. It is located in the center of the oblast. Its administrative center is the urban locality (an urban-type settlement) of Zmiyovka. Population: 16,311 (2010 Census);  The population of Zmiyovka accounts for 36.6% of the district's total population.

Notable residents 

Nikolai Leskov (1831–1895), writer, born in Gorokhovo
Aleksey Semenovich Zhadov (1901–1977), Red Army officer, born in the village of Nikolskoye

References

Notes

Sources

Districts of Oryol Oblast